The 2015–16 Eintracht Frankfurt season was the 116th season in the club's football history. In 2015–16 the club plays in the Bundesliga, the top tier of German football. It was the club’s fourth season back in the Bundesliga and the 47th overall.

Friendlies

Competitions

Bundesliga

League table

Results summary

Results by round

Matches

Relegation play-offs

DFB-Pokal

Squad

Squad and statistics

|}

Transfers

Transferred in

Transferred out

References

External links
 Official English Eintracht website 
 German archive site
 2015–16 Eintracht Frankfurt season at kicker.de 
 2015–16 Eintracht Frankfurt season at Fussballdaten.de 

 

2015-16
German football clubs 2015–16 season